Voice in the Wilderness or "a lone voice in the wilderness" is an English idiom for someone who expresses an idea or opinion that is not popular or that the individual is the sole person expressing that particular opinion with the suggestion that the opinion is then ignored.

It is from the King James Bible,   "... voice of one crying in the wilderness ..." and  "The voice of him that crieth in the wilderness ...".

Voice in the Wilderness may refer to:

 "A Voice in the Wilderness" (song), a song by Cliff Richard from the 1959 film Expresso Bongo
 "A Voice in the Wilderness" (Babylon 5), a 1994 television episode
 A Voice Crying in the Wilderness: Notes from a Secret Journal, a 1989 book by Edward Abbey

 Voices in the Wilderness, 2003 album
 Voices in the Wilderness (organization)

The Latin of the Vulgate Version, "Vox clamantis in deserto" may refer to:

 Vox Clamantis, a 14th-century poem by John Gower about the Peasants' Rising
 The motto of Dartmouth College
 Offertory ex D "Vox clamantis in deserto” (18th century), by Václav Jan Kopřiva
 Ego sum vox clamantis in deserto, a sermon written in 1510 by Pedro de Córdoba

See also

 Cassandra
 Voice of Wilderness, a 2005 studio album by Korpiklaani